The Brewin Dolphin Commodores’ Cup is a biennial amateur team sailing regatta first held in 1992. The competition is organised by the Royal Ocean Racing Club  consists of a number of events held in the oceans of the Solent, the English channel and the Isle of Wight. Each team consists of three boats, two of them rated between 1.020 and 1.230 using the IRC rating system and one boat rated above 1.150. As a Corinthian (amateur) event, the boats rated between 1.020 and 1.230 can only have one Category 3 sailor and the boat rated above 1.150 may only have two. The most recent competition was held in 2014 from the 19th to the 26th of July and was won by Ireland.

2008 teams
For the 2008 event, a total of six nations and 15 teams were competing, two up from the 2006 event.

 France - four teams
 Hong Kong - one team
 Ireland - two teams
 Spain - one team
 Netherlands - three teams
 United Kingdom - four teams

2010 teams
In the 2010 Commodores Cup a total of ten teams from five nations competed, with Ireland claiming overall victory.

 1st overall -  - Ireland - 73.5 points
 2nd overall -  - Hong Kong - 117.5 points
 3rd overall -  - France Blue - 136 points
 4th overall -  - France Yellow - 167 points
 5th overall -  - GBR Red - 175 points
 6th overall -  - GBR White - 187.5 points
 7th overall -  - South Africa - 202 points
 8th overall -  - France White - 210 points
 9th overall -  - France Red - 233.5 points
 10th overall -  - GBR Black - 322 points

The full list of results is available on the Royal Ocean Racing Club website.

References

External links
 Brewin Dolphin Commodores' Cup official website
 Rolex Yachting News and Images website

Recurring events established in 1992
Sailing competitions in the United Kingdom
Sport on the Isle of Wight